Photograph Smile is the fifth studio album by English singer-songwriter Julian Lennon.

Release

It was released in May 1998, after a seven-year hiatus following his previous album, Help Yourself. A promotional sampler was released in 1999 in the US containing the tracks: "I Don't Wanna Know", "Day After Day" and "And She Cries".

Music videos
The music video of "I Don't Wanna Know" features a parody band of The Beatles called The Butlers. The beginning of the music video has The Butlers (Ken, a parody of John Lennon; Bongo, a parody of Ringo Starr; Daisy, a parody of George Harrison; and Hector, a parody of Paul McCartney) in a concert with many screaming fans. The concert takes place on a stage similar to the arrow stage from The Beatles' appearance on The Ed Sullivan Show. There is also a box seat with the Queen in it from the Royal Variety Performance. The first and third segments of the video are filmed in black and white.

Track listing

Personnel

Musicians 
 Julian Lennon – lead and backing vocals, keyboards, acoustic guitar, sitar, tambourine, shaker, string arrangements, arrangements
 Bob Rose – keyboards, string arrangements, scoring, conductor
 Gregory Darling – acoustic piano 
 Steve Sidelnyk – programming 
 Matt Backer – acoustic guitar, electric guitar, electric guitar solo (1)
 Robbie Blunt – acoustic guitar, electric guitar, sitar, electric guitar solo (5)
 Justin Clayton – acoustic guitar, electric guitar, acoustic guitar solo (2), electric guitar solo (5)
 Donal Lunny – bouzouki solo (8)
 Simon Edwards – bass
 Manny Elias – drums 
 Paul Clarvis – ethnic percussion, tabla
 The Irish National Symphony Orchestra – strings
 Orchestra Di Santa Cecilia – strings
 Mark Spiro – guest vocals (11)
 Gemma Hayes – guest vocals (13)

Production 
 Julian Lennon – producer, mixing, cover design, liner notes 
 Bob Rose – producer, engineer, mixing 
 Andrew Boland – additional engineer 
 Conal Markey – additional engineer 
 Bernie Grundman – mastering 
 Marco – technician 
 Angelica Letsch – graphic art, layout

Studios
 Recorded at AIR Studios (London, UK); Rockfield Studios (Wales, UK); Windmill Lane Studios (Dublin, Ireland); Forum Studios (Rome, Italy); Studio Mulinetti (Genova, Italy)
 Mastered at Bernie Grundman Mastering (Hollywood, California)

Charts

Release history

References

External links
Album information on Photograph Smile from heyjules.com

1999 albums
Julian Lennon albums
Baroque pop albums